The Parkes Weber Prize is a prize awarded annually by the Royal Numismatic Society for original research relating to numismatics by a young scholar under the age of thirty.

About the prize 
The prize is named after the British numismatist Frederick Parkes Weber. It was instituted in 1954 and is under the administration of the Council of the Royal Numismatic Society. It is awarded for an original essay of not more than 5,000 words on any subject relating to coins, medals, medallions, tokens or paper money.

Prize winners 
Many of the prizewinners have gone on to have distinguished academic or heritage careers:
1954 D.W. Dykes - 'Some local tokens and their issuers in early nineteenth century Swansea'
Highly commended: I. H. Stewart - 'Aspects of coinage and currency in medieval Scotland'
1955 D.M. Metcalf
1956 I. Stewart
1959 D. Nugus and D.E. Hanson
1965 P. O’Shea
1966 C.M. Hake
1967 S. Leggett
1968 I.C. Thomson
1969 M.R. Curry
1970 H. Emary
1971 M.A. Guilding
1972 M.A.S. Blackburn and S. Cope
1974 G.C. Kumpikevicius
1975 M. Flower and A.G. Wager
1976 K. Costello
1977 R. Macpherson
1978 M.B. Pearson
1979 R.B. Sampson
1982 M.J. Druck
1983 N. Summerton - Ancient British Coins
1991 M. Rockman
1992 Henry S. Kim
1993 E. Theran
1994 John Orna-Ornstein
1997 S. Armstrong, T.C. Crafter and P. Kiernan
2000 E.L. Cheung
2002 P. Kiernan
2003 S. Skaltsa
2004 N. Elkins
2005 Rory Naismith
2006 Di Hu
2008 Rebecca Day [Darley]
2011 Lauren Proctor
2012 Tom Waldwyn
2013 Matthew Naiman and Victoria Collins
2014 Murray Andrews and Supratik Baralay
2015 Michael Economou
2018a George Green - ‘The relationship between the Romans and their gold coinage A.D. 64−A.D. 200’
2018b Charlotte Mann - 'The circulation of Festival coins struck for the Eleusinian Mysteries'
2021 Bridget McClean

References

Awards for numismatics
Royal Numismatic Society